Soldanella alpina, the alpine snowbell or blue moonwort, is a member of the family Primulaceae native to the Alps and Pyrenees.

References

External links

Royal Horticultural Society

Primulaceae
Alpine flora
Flora of the Alps
Plants described in 1753
Taxa named by Carl Linnaeus